Bruce Aitken (born 1953 in Invercargill, New Zealand) is a rock and world jazz drummer. Later in his career he also became a singer and songwriter.

Aitken began his career in New Zealand, performing with the band Rogers Dodgers and later Heathen Grace. In 1975 he formed Gratis Kinetic with Stephen Galvin, John Mcrea, Greg Mooney and Murray Watt which released the single 'Taken All' on PYE Records written by Greg Mooney. Gratis Kinetic toured throughout New Zealand and appeared on TV1's Grunt Machine. He moved between Australia and New Zealand from the 1970s to the early 1990s as he continued his music career with various bands.

In 1998, Aitken moved to Canada and became a citizen there in 2003. He has since worked with several eastern Canadian artists such as John Campbelljohn, Gordie Sampson and J. P. Cormier. He has received multiple East Coast Music Award nominations, and produced the Cape Breton International Drum Festival from 2001 to 2010 inclusive.

Aitken was featured nationally on the television programme On The Road Again. He was inducted into the Southland, New Zealand Rock and Roll Hall of Fame in 2008. He toured with John Campbelljohn in Canada & Europe and with Fred Eaglesmith in Canada.

Awards
Music Nova Scotia 2004 Musician of the Year
Music Nova Scotia 2010 Award of Excellence

References

External links
 Bruce Aitken biography
Autobiography

People from Invercargill
New Zealand emigrants to Canada
Canadian rock drummers
Canadian male drummers
New Zealand drummers
1953 births
Living people
Canadian male jazz musicians